Bulbulay (English: Bubbles) is a Pakistani family sitcom series about an unconventional Pakistani family of four. The show is directed by Rana Rizwan, written by Ali Imran and Saba Hassan, and produced by Nabeel, who also plays the lead character of the show. The show gained popularity after the introduction of Hina Dilpazeer, who plays Mumtaz (Momo) in the 25th episode.

Bulbulay first aired on 22 October 2009 on ARY Digital and was later broadcast on ARY Digital UK. It is a successful sitcom with a high TRP, and it holds the record for the longest-running television series of Pakistan.

In July 2017, the series went off-air and did not return to air on ARY Digital. Instead starting on 7 May 2019, the show began airing new episodes on BOL Entertainment under the title of Phir Bulbulay, but was halted quickly due to copyright issues, as BOL was not allowed to air the comedy serial.

Bulbulay (season 2) began to air on ARY Digital from 4 June 2019 (Eid ul Fitr 2019), and aired a weekly episode every Saturday evening. As of March 2023, 201 episodes have been released as part of season 2.

Plot

Season 1
Most episodes are about Nabeel, Khoobsurat, Momo and Mehmood being conned, robbed, or just having bad luck. Every episode ends with the family being ripped off, or either of the men getting a beating from his wife for flirting with other women. The storyline starts off with Nabeel and Mehmood living in an apartment as bachelors and progresses to both of them marrying and having children.

The show is known to break the fourth wall all the time.

Episode 1–25 (Pre-marriage)
Nabeel's childhood friend Ahmad moves abroad and tells Nabeel to look after his apartment. Nabeel takes advantage of this and starts living in the apartment as landlord and rents out a room to Mehmood. Khoobsurat, who ran away from her wedding just fifteen minutes before it took place, arrives at the same apartment looking for her friend Saima, who is married to Ahmed. Although Nabeel first tells her she cannot move in, he changes his mind after she threatens to tell Saima about the misuse of the apartment.

When Khoobsoorat's father, Siddiqui, comes to take her back, she tells him that she is married to Nabeel to stop him. When Nabeel's mother, Mumtaz, comes to visit him, he says that Khoobsurat is the housemaid, as his mother would not accept his living together with a woman.

Later in the series, Khoobsurat's father finds out his daughter is unmarried, and informs her that he is coming to take her back home. Nabeel's mother comes to visit her son and tells him that Khoobsurat is a good girl and that they should get married. When she asks Khoobsurat, Khoobsurat is shocked and decides to leave. Later, Nabeel tells Khoobsurat that he really loves her and had fallen in love with her when he saw her for the fourth time (chothi nazar main); and, so, he wants to marry her. Mehmood and Mumtaz started to like each other and want to get married. At Nabeel and Khoobsurat's marriage, after their nikah is read, Nabeel wishes Mehmood could also marry someone along with him on the same day and place, to his surprise, Mehmood replies that he has already decided a wife. Mehmood announces he will marry Mumtaz and tells the qadi to wait and read their nikah as well. Nabeel is shocked by this and feels very uncomfortable about his mother being close to Mehmood. At this moment, Siddiqui arrives to cancel his daughter's wedding. Nabeel informs him that the nikah papers have already been signed. Siddiqui gets very mad, for letting his daughter marry such a wrongful man. In the meantime, Butt sahab, a policeman, enters the scene, demanding the wedding be stopped as it was not legal to marry after 12 am. Siddiqui gives money to dismiss Butt sahab.

Episode 26–82 (After marriage)
(Nabeel's mother becomes a regular cast member after episode 25.)

Soon after the couples get married, Nabeel gets a call from Ahmad, who tells him he has found someone who will move into the apartment, and that they have two days to move out. Luckily, Khoobsurat's father arranges for a new place for them to live and pays in advance, so that they do not struggle.

Siddiqui also finds a good job offer for Nabeel. Nabeel is forced to attend the job interview by his wife, Khoobsurat. Nabeel later gets declined due to his demanding of a salary of Rs.3–4 lakhs, saying he is made for much bigger things and will not work for anyone who does not see his true potential. As soon as the Bulbulay family move to a new house, the title theme of the drama changed.

Episode 83–87 (Bubulay in Dubai)
The Bulbulay family goes to Dubai, but without telling each other. Nabeel and Khoobsurat win a trip to Dubai from a lucky draw. Mehmood and Mumtaz go to Dubai for their honeymoon, with their own money. They happen to be booked into the same hotel. While walking in the hall, Nabeel and Mehmood bump into each other. They pretend that they don't know each other and rush back to their rooms. When both families have plans to go to the Oasis Mall, and both Mehmood and Nabeel are taking showers in their rooms, Khoobsurat and Momo wait for them in the hotel lobby and see each other clearly.

Momo goes out of the hotel to avoid Khoobsurat and rushes off in a taxi to the mall. Khoobsurat, Nabeel, and Mehmood go out to find her. After they're reunited, they go to Ibn Battuta Mall the next day, where they meet FM radio producers and are offered jobs that don't work out. Nabeel later meets a woman and starts flirting with her, and convincing her that he is rich and that he has many businesses. Mehmood sahab finds out, and tries to stop Nabeel but this backfires. Afterwards, the family heads to the mall, but Nabeel makes up excuses to go back to the hotel, so Mehmood sahab drugs Nabeel's coffee cup to ruin his date. Nabeel then returns to the hotel and invites the woman to stay in his hotel room. He kept going to the washroom repeatedly due to the effect of the drug. Khoobsurat returns from the mall and discovers the truth, which later on makes her angry at Nabeel.

The next day, Momo meets a man in the hotel lounge and mistakenly picks up his bag thinking it's hers. The man is ordered by his boss to follow Momo to get the bag back, as it contains cash. Meanwhile, the boss, who the bag had belonged to, finds out that Momo is the leader of the Bulbulay gang, so he captures Nabeel, Mehmood, and Khoobsurat, and then blackmails Momo to return the bag in exchange for her gang. The boss then orders the man to capture the bag from her possession. Momo realizing that the bag has cash inside; instead gives a small portion of the money to the man. The boss frees the family thinking the man had received the money. Momo, still having possession of the bag, tells the family and they immediately rush towards the airport.

Episode 88–100 (pre-parenthood)
(From episode 88, Faizan Shahzad Khan joined Team Bulbulay as associate director and actor)

While returning home from Dubai, Momo loses her bag at the airport. Khoobsurat becomes ill and the others start avoiding her in the fear of catching her disease. Later, Khoobsurat is found to be pregnant, shortly after which Momo also becomes pregnant. Most of the episodes involve the family making preparations for the arrival of their children. Nabeel, however, is unhappy that his mother is having a baby at her age. These episodes also show their pre-parenthood lifestyle in the holy month of Ramadan. On the 100th, Eid-Special episode, Momo and Khoobsurat give birth to a baby son and daughter, respectively.

Episode 101–139 (parenthood)
Both couples become parents. Mehmood Sahab and Momo name their son Sona, which means gold; and Khoobsurat and Nabeel name their daughter Chaandi, which means silver. These episodes involve events taking place after Sona and Chaandi's births. Nabeel and Mehmood are pressured by their wives to take up jobs to support their children. When the children are admitted into school, the couples compete to see who can provide better for their children.

Episode 140–143 (Bulbulay in Lahore)
The family races to Lahore to visit Khoobsurat's father, Siddiqui, whom they cannot contact and are worried about. Meanwhile, Siddiqui marries a young woman named Betaab (بیتاب). At first, Siddiqui hides her from them by convincing them there is a soul roaming in the house, but eventually, Siddiqui tells them the truth, which upsets Khoobsurat. On the next day, Siddiqui and his wife leave for their honeymoon, leaving the family behind.

Betaab's brother wants his sister to come back home, and arrives to confront the Bulbulay family. Nabeel tells him that she has gone to her honeymoon with Siddiqui. After not being able to contact Siddiqui, he gets angry and shoots Mehmood sahab. Mehmood sahab plays dead. While they mourn his death, Betaab's brother pays Rs. 12,500 to them because they had threatened to call the police. Betaab's brother comes back and realizes that the gun was fake, later wanting Nabeel's wife in exchange for her sister.

Later, an old friend from the UK visits Siddiqui's house with cash. Nabeel and Mehmood sahab fool him into thinking Siddiqui has died. They take advantage of his money and buy food, and take the money for their traveling expenses from Lahore to Karachi. In the end, they were try escaping, but encounter Siddiqui and his wife, who have returned from their honeymoon.

Episode 144–204
The Bulbulay family returns to Javed sahab's house in Karachi. They get into numerous problems and get robbed several times.

Episode 205–209 (Bulbulay again in Lahore)
The family goes to Lahore after Siddiqui invites Khoobsurat and Chandi to stay in his new house in Lahore. Before they leave, Betaab misplaces the address. The fun starts when they all arrive at Siddiqui's new house.

Siddiqui becomes furious at Betaab for allowing the Bulbulay family to his home, so he requests her to become a jinn to scare away the family. But things don't work out as Nabeel figures out Siddiqui's true intentions. In the meantime, Mehmood executes the role of Baba to release the jinn from Betaab. He sprinkles petrol on her, and as he is about to request for a matchstick, Betaab confesses the truth.

Mehmood's old friend is welcomed to the house. Believing he's rich, Nabeel and Mehmood need to satisfy their costs to visit Minar-e-Pakistan from his wealth. But, the old friend requires the cash that Mehmood owed him ages ago, which is equivalent to Rs. 11 lakhs in the present. Not having cash, he is requested to stay in their house as he is broke. Betaab notices him in the house and he is later framed for being a thief.

One month has passed. Mehmood eavesdrops on Siddiqui, talking about eliminating the Bulbulay family with a bomb. He wakes up early to prepare breakfast. Meanwhile, Siddiqui and Betaab are outside watching a movie and having private time. Mehmood hears a tick-tock sound and assumes it's a time bomb. He tells everyone, and they plan to go out of the house to avoid it but the front door is locked. Later, Mehmood attempts to diffuse the bomb but it turns out to be an alarm clock hidden by Momo.

Siddiqui gets enraged and yells at Nabeel for consuming so much of his money. Nabeel comes up with a plan to seek revenge. He hires an actor to play as Siddiqui's wife to in an attempt to sour the relations between Siddiqui and Betaab. It works out, and Siddiqui pays Rs. 5 lakh to let go of the woman, but eventually, he finds out Nabeel's true intentions. Nabeel, Mehmood, and Momo run away. Nabeel tells Khoobsurat to return with Chandi back to Karachi.

Episode 210–217
They return to Karachi.

Episode 218–267
They are normal, with performances by Momo and Nabeel. Five years have transpired since their marriage.

Episode 268–273 (rich)
They become rich because of the jinn Ibn e Battuta, son of Battuta, who is a big fan of Momo. A magician had imprisoned him in a bottle, but he now free. In episode 273, the kidnappers Tome and Moti arrive at the new location and kidnap Nabeel. Momo tells them that all their wealth is in the bottle. They open the bottle and the jinn appears.

Episode 274–297 (poor)
The jinn takes all their wealth back, and the family becomes poor. In episode 297, Javed Sahab arrives at the new location of Bulbulay to take the family back to the old location. Javed sahab files a FIR because they did not pay the rent for 1 year. In the end, they all try to run away but encounter Siddiqui at their front door.

Episode 298–455 (back to the classic Bulbulay)
They return to Javed Sahab's's house. Siddiqui pays Javed the family's rent. The family realizes that the Ramadan moon has been sighted, and episode 298 is all about the family making Siddiqui do all their work because he isn't fasting. It's back to the situations of the early episodes in which Nabeel and his family have bad luck. In episode 455, the family decides to go to a world tour.

Special episodes
Bulbulay Show Special was a two-hour episode (live show) in which the Bulbulay characters were live on ARY Digital, where they met their fans who were present there and took calls from those who weren't. The Bulbulay characters were highly appreciated by their fans.
 
On 20 May 2016, the cast and writer Ali Imran were invited on ARY Digital morning show Good Morning Pakistan to celebrate 400 episodes of Bulbulay.

Season 2

Episode 1 (shifting to new house) 
The Bulbulay family shifts to the new house. When Momo and Khoobsurat enter the house, there find two strangers there. Momo and Khoobsurat think they are robbers. They tell Nabeel and Mehmood sahab. Momo then knocks out the strangers. Then a person tells them that those two people were knaves who didn't pay rent for the house. They were very dangerous people who were caught by the police after a 6-month search.

Episode 2 
Sher Khan marries to Ghulbaght, who later approaches Nabeel and tells him she loves him. She says that she will shoot Sher Khan and Khoobsurat, and forces Nabeel to marry her after she divorces Sher Khan. Sher Khan thinks that his new wife loves him, but it is revealed that both came up with the idea to shoot Nabeel.

Episode 3 (ghost sighting) 
In this episode, they see a ghost while sleeping. They awake and come running outside. The next day, they call a man who would make the ghost go away, but the ghost and the man are acting together, and are actually robbers. The man first ate food saying he has no power and ate all the food, after which the girl they saw at night came. They screamed and ran into the house. The girl pretends to be kind. She says she had prepared some food. Nabeel and Mehmood sahab are enamoured of her, so they eat the food. They all fall asleep for 1 hour. When they wake up, they find all their belongings have been stolen.

Season 1 episodes by Year
 2009: episodes 1–11
 2010: episodes 12–60
 2011: episodes 61–118
 2012: episodes 119–190
 2013: episodes 191–275
 2014: episodes 276–330
 2015: episodes 331–379
 2016: episodes 380–433
 2017: episodes 434–455

Season 2 episodes by Year
 2019: episodes 1–33
 2020: episodes 33–84
 2021: episodes 85–134
 2022: episodes 135–183
 2023: episodes 184–201

Series overview

Cast and characters

Main
 Nabeel as Nabeel (Mumtaz's son), who has many girlfriends. 
 Ayesha Omar as Khoobsurat (Nabeel's wife)
 Mehmood Aslam as Mehmood sahab
 Hina Dilpazeer as Mumtaz (Momo) (Mehmood sahab's wife)
 Ashraf Khan as Mustaqeem
 Shagufta Ejaz as Joji Begum (Mustaqeem's wife)
 Faatima Nabeel as Chandi (Nabeel and Khoobsurat's daughter)
 Nyle Rizwan as Sona (Mehmood and Mumtaz's son)

Recurring
 Tariq Butt as Butt Sahab (2009–2022) 
 Khawaja Akmal as Siddiqui (Khoobsurat's father) (2009–2017)
 Benita David as Baytab (2012–2015)
 Shahid Khawaja as Dr. Shahid 612 (2013–present)
 Shehraz Hassan as Moti (kidnapper) (2010–2015)
 Ayaz Khan as Sher Khan (Mehmood's friend) (2012–present)
 Faizan Shahzad Khan as Faizi Sun (2010–2015)

Guest appearances
 Aijaz Aslam as Rosho; Nabeel's deceased father (2011–2014)
 Shamoon Abbasi as Afzal (2013 and 2009)
 Fatima Effendi as big fan (2021)
 Nayyar Ejaz as Nayyar Bhai (brother-in-law of Mehmood Sahab) (2010–2012)
 Shagufta Ejaz as Hajra Appa (Sister of Mehmood Sahab) (2010)
 Reema Khan on Eid Special
 Zuhab Khan as Zeeshan, a child lost in a market whom Momo brought home with her
 Uroosa Siddiqui as Dr. Uroosa
 Irfan Motiwala as a thief, in Ramadan episode 160, and, in another episode, as kidnapper of Mehmood (2012–2013)
 Maqsood Hassan as the Devil in Ramadan in episode 163 and 233, and in another episode as a don (2011–2013) and as a magician and in another episode.
 Ashraf Khan as Momo's father who appeared in many episodes of Bulbulay. He also appeared as Khoobsurat's boss and doctor in different episodes. (first appeared in episode 7 of season 1 in 2009)
 Badar Khalil as Momo's mother who appeared in many episodes of Bulbulay (2010–2014)
 Faysal Qureshi as himself (in 2009 and 2012)
 Saleem Miraj as Abdul Kareem (plumber) (2010–2013)
 Sadia Ghaffar as Janan (Khoobsurat's friend) (2013)
 Sonia Rao as Chanda (salesgirl) (2013–2017)
 Sofia Ahmed as Pari (2013)
 Sunita Marshall as Khoobsurat's friend Nazar (episode 10 of season 1 in 2009)
 Rashid Farooqui as Canadian immigration agent (Shamim Gora) (2011)
 Faizan Shahzad Khan as Faizi Sun episodes 274 – 297 (2010–2015)
 Nasir Sharif as thief in episode 430 (2012–2016)
 Ismail Tara as Ibn e Battutta Jinn, in many episodes, and in another episode as a detective (2013–2014)
 Behroze Sabzwari as Muqqaddar (Momo's fiancée) in episodes 65 and 163 (2011–2012)
 Mohsin Raza Gillani as a friend of Javed Sahab (2013)
 Dodi Khan as Kalia (2016–2017)
 Marhaba Sheikh as Masoom (2017)
 M Saleem as Qazi (2016–2017)
 Arif Siddiqui as agent of poor location (2013–2017)
 Shehnaz Pervaiz as Momo's sister in episode 156 (2012–2016)
 Haneef Bachan as Javed Sahab (2014–2016)
 Kauser Siddiqui as Nabeel's girlfriend in episode 354, and in episode 445 as Siddiqui's lawyer (2015–2016)
 Munir Ahmad on Eid Ul Azha special, episode 318, as Qasim, a thief who came to take a goat because it had eaten his diamond (2014)
 Hanif Awan as a police inspector in episode 314 (2014)
 Javeria Abbasi as Nabeel's kidnapper and maid (in 2009, 2010 and 2013)
 Fazal Baltistani as Anwar Kaana in episode 379 (2011–2017)
 Shahab Khan (2014–2017)
 Anum Aqeel as Sonia in episode 453 (2015–2017)
 Hafeez Ali as Khawaja Sira (2009)
 Agha Sheraz as Arabpati Beta in episode 15 (2009–2015)
 Mehboob Sultan as Jaggu Dada (2012–2016)
 Umair Laghari as Khoobsurat's cousin, Tommy (2014–2015)
 Ghulam Mehdi (2015)
 Aadi Adeal Amjad as Bayqarar (2015)
 Obaid Khan (2010–2015)
 Sara Omar as Malka (2011)
 Masoodi (2010–2011)
 Master Zohaib as another child lost; Mehmood Sahab took her (2010)
 Bahadur Sheikh as Jaggu Dada punter (2009–2016)
 Adnan Shah Tipu as Nabeel's friend in episode 168
 Amber Khan as Nabeel's girlfriend in episode 70 (2011)
 Naeem Sheikh as Khoobsurat's uncle in episode 41 (2010–2012)
 Aslam Rana as Baba (2010–2011)

Copyright issues
Nabeel Zafar, the producer of Bulbulay, joined BOL TV as its CEO few years back and decided to bring Bulbulay to BOL. On 7 May 2019, Bulbulay released its second season, titled "Phir Bulbulay", after a gap of 2 years on the BOL Network entertainment channel BOL Entertainment, even though ARY possessed the rights.

However, Nabeel resigned after a dispute with BOL and there were no further talks of shifting Bulbulay from ARY to BOL. After BOL started airing Phir Bulbulay, ARY filed a lawsuit against them for airing the show illegally. Finally, the court issued a stay order against BOL TV and restricted them from airing the sitcom on their channel.

Assistant directors
 Zahid Ali Balti (2009–2010): episodes 1–37
 Faizan Shahzad Khan (2010): episodes 36–39
 Vickey (2010): episodes 40–53
 Waqas Javed (2010–2011): episodes 54–83
 Nasir Sharif (2015)
 Faizan Shahzad Khan as associate/casting director (2011–2015): episodes 88–361

Reception
Due to its popularity, the series is broadcast in other countries, including the UK.

Awards and nominations

See also
 List of programs broadcast by ARY Digital

References

External links
 
 

Pakistani television sitcoms
Pakistani drama television series
Comedy-drama television series
Urdu-language television shows
Television shows set in Karachi
ARY Digital original programming
2009 Pakistani television series debuts
2000s Pakistani television series
2010s Pakistani television series